HKS may refer to:

Businesses and Organizations 
 HKS (company), Japanese automotive accessory company
 HKS, Inc., an international architecture firm
 HKSTV, a Hong Kong satellite television network
 Hibbitt, Karlsson & Sorensen, now SIMULIA, a software company
 HKS (American company), American company that makes speedloaders

Sport 
 Croatian Basketball Federation
 Hapoel Kfar Saba F.C., an Israeli football club
 Hong Kong Scottish, a Hong Kong rugby union club
 Hong Kong Squash, the national organization for squash in Hong Kong
 Ruch Chorzów, a Polish football club

Transport 
 CHC Helikopter Service, a Norwegian helicopter operator
 Hawkins Field (airport) in Jackson, Mississippi, United States
 Hoogkarspel railway station, in the Netherlands

Other uses 
 HKS (colour system)
Croatian Conservative Party
 Harvard Kennedy School at Harvard University
 Heat kernel signature
 Hip-knee-shaft angle in orthopedics
 Hong Kong Sign Language
 Hezb-e Kargaran-e Socialist, the Socialist Workers' Party of Iran